Shafiqua Maloney (born 27 February 1999) is a middle-distance runner from Saint Vincent and the Grenadines. She holds the 800 m national record both indoors and outdoors.

She studied for two years at Southern Illinois University and in 2018 moved to the University of Arkansas. She has competed at 200m, 400m, 800m and in 300m hurdles events. She won the 800 m gold and the 400 m silver medal in the 2021 NACAC U23 Championships.

She competed in the women's 800m event at the 2020 Summer Olympics, and was the sole flag-bearer for her country in the Parade of Nations during the opening ceremony.

References

External links

Arkansas Razorbacks bio

1999 births
Living people
Saint Vincent and the Grenadines female athletes
Olympic athletes of Saint Vincent and the Grenadines
Olympic female middle-distance runners
Southern Illinois Salukis women's track and field athletes
Arkansas Razorbacks women's track and field athletes
Athletes (track and field) at the 2020 Summer Olympics
People from Charlotte Parish, Saint Vincent and the Grenadines